The 1904 Washington Senators won 38 games, lost 113, and finished in eighth place in the American League. They were managed by Malachi Kittridge and Patsy Donovan and played home games at National Park.

Regular season

Season standings

Record vs. opponents

Notable transactions 
 July 20, 1904: Davey Dunkle was purchased from the Senators by the Louisville Colonels.

Roster

Player stats

Batting

Starters by position 
Note: Pos = Position; G = Games played; AB = At bats; H = Hits; Avg. = Batting average; HR = Home runs; RBI = Runs batted in

Other batters 
Note: G = Games played; AB = At bats; H = Hits; Avg. = Batting average; HR = Home runs; RBI = Runs batted in

Pitching

Starting pitchers 
Note: G = Games pitched; IP = Innings pitched; W = Wins; L = Losses; ERA = Earned run average; SO = Strikeouts

Other pitchers 
Note: G = Games pitched; IP = Innings pitched; W = Wins; L = Losses; ERA = Earned run average; SO = Strikeouts

See also
List of worst Major League Baseball season records

Notes

References 
1904 Washington Senators at Baseball-Reference
1904 Washington Senators team page at www.baseball-almanac.com

Minnesota Twins seasons
Washington Senators season
Washington